Tracy Dawn Scoggins (born in 1953 in Dickinson, Texas or November 13, 1959, in Galveston, Texas) is an American actress known for her roles as Monica Colby in the 1980s primetime soap opera Dynasty and its spin-off series The Colbys, Cat Grant in the first season of the 1993–1997 television series Lois & Clark: The New Adventures of Superman, and as Captain Elizabeth Lochley during the final season of Babylon 5 in 1998.

Early life
An only child, Scoggins is the daughter of John Scott Scoggins and Lou Cille Scoggins. Her father was a trial lawyer, and her mother graduated from law school and was a tennis champion. She attributes her own success to their influence.

At the age of nine, Scoggins won a diving championship; by 13, she was accumulating swimming medals.  At Dickinson High School, Scoggins was an athlete, excelling in various sports such as cheerleading, gymnastics, and diving. She graduated from Dickinson High School at age 16 and enrolled at Southwest Texas State University in 1970.  As a student-athlete there, she was on the varsity gymnastics team and graduated with a bachelor's degree in physical education. While at Southwest Texas State, Scoggins nearly qualified for a spot on the 1980 Olympic diving team.

After graduation, Scoggins briefly taught physical education before being recruited by John Casablancas of the Elite Model Management agency. Elite sent Scoggins to New York, where she worked for a year before embarking on a European fashion modeling circuit that included Italy, Germany, and France.
Scoggins returned to the United States and studied with the Herbert Berghof Studio and the Wynn Hanmann Studio in hopes of launching an acting career.

Career

Scoggins' first role was as a fake deputy sheriff in the fourth season Dukes of Hazzard episode "New Deputy in Town" in 1981;  she then appeared in the TV movie Twirl. She was cast as a regular in the short-lived 1983 TV series Renegades. The following year, she was cast as a regular on the 1984 ABC television series Hawaiian Heat, which lasted 11 episodes.

After guest roles in TV series such as Remington Steele, T. J. Hooker, Blue Thunder, and The A-Team, Scoggins had a role on the Dynasty spin-off series The Colbys, playing Monica Colby,  the daughter of Charlton Heston's character, with Scoggins appearing as Monica from 1985–1987 in two episodes of Dynasty followed by all 49 episodes of The Colbys. Nearly two years after the cancellation of The Colbys after two seasons in 1987, Scoggins reprised the role of Monica Colby in the last eight episodes of the final season of Dynasty in 1989.

Scoggins landed recurring or short-term parts on TV series during the 1980s and 1990s, including the role of Cat Grant in Lois & Clark: The New Adventures of Superman, Amanda Carpenter on Lonesome Dove: The Outlaw Years, Elizabeth Lochley on  Babylon 5 and its two spin-offs Crusade and Babylon 5: The Lost Tales (in 2007), Cassandra in three episodes of Highlander: The Series, Marie-Diane on The Secret Adventures of Jules Verne, and Anita Smithfield in two Dallas TV movies (Dallas: J.R. Returns and Dallas: War of the Ewings). This was not her first role in Dallas, as she had played a small part as another character, Diane Kelly, in a 1983 episode. Scoggins appeared on a 1996 episode of Wings and in the Star Trek: Deep Space Nine episode "Destiny"'.

Scoggins starred in the 1992 straight-to-video production Demonic Toys. She was in the 1995 3DO game Snow Job.

Alan Spencer cast Scoggins in a  pilot for CBS called Galaxy Beat.  The pilot did not sell. Spencer said that she is "one of the funniest people on Earth".

In 2005, Scoggins landed a role as a main character, Grace Neville, on the gay supernatural series Dante's Cove. In 2006, she had a guest role in the fourth-season premiere of the TV show Nip/Tuck, and returned to the role of Elizabeth Lochley in the direct-to-DVD production Babylon 5: The Lost Tales. Her recent television credits include NCIS and Castle.

Filmography

Television

 The Dukes of Hazzard as Linda Mae Barnes (1 episode, 1981)
 The Devlin Connection as Sylvia March (1 episode, 1982)
 The Fall Guy as June (1 episode, 1982)
 Remington Steele as Chrissie Carstairs (1 episode, 1983)
 The Optimist as The Lady Golfer (1 episode, 1983)
 Dallas as Diane Kelly (1 episode, 1983)
 Manimal as Kathy Bonann (1 episode, 1983)
 Hardcastle and McCormick as Crystal Dawn (1 episode, 1983)
 The A-Team as Shana Mayer / Elly Payne (3 episodes, 1983)
 The Renegades as Tracy (1983)
 Hawaiian Heat (1984) as Irene Gorley
 T. J. Hooker as Jill Newmark (1 episode, 1984)
 Mike Hammer as Claire (1 episode, 1984)
 Blue Thunder as Gretchen Terrell (1 episode, 1984)
 Hawaiian Heat as Irene Gorley (10 episodes, 1984)
 The Colbys as Monica Colby (49 episodes, 1985–1987)
 Hotel as Dana March (1 episode, 1987)
 Dynasty as Monica Colby (10 episodes, 1985, 1989)
 Raven as Alexis Page (1 episode, 1992)
 Renegade as Jeanette (1 episode, 1992)
 The Heights as Belinda (1 episode, 1992)
 Doogie Howser, M.D. as Kelly Phillips (1 episode, 1993)
 Danger Theatre as Clarise Payne (1 episode, 1993)
 Burke's Law as Roxanne North (1 episode, 1994)
 Garfield and Friends as Heather St. Claire (1 episode, 1994)
 Lois & Clark: The New Adventures of Superman as Catherine 'Cat' Grant (20 episodes, 1993–1994)
 The Commish as Christine Rivers (1 episode, 1995)
 Star Trek: Deep Space Nine as Gilora (1 episode, 1995)
 Cybill as Invincigirl (1 episode, 1996)
 Unhappily Ever After as Morgana (1 episode, 1996)
 Wings as Elise (1 episode, 1996)
 Lonesome Dove: The Outlaw Years as Amanda Carpenter (22 episodes, 1995–1996)
 Highlander as Cassandra (3 episodes, 1996–1997)
 High Tide as Christy Keaton (1 episode, 1997)
 Silk Stalkings as Jessica Scott (2 episodes, 1993–1997)
 Mike Hammer, Private Eye as Beth Reynolds (1 episode, 1997)
 Babylon 5 as Capt. Elizabeth Lochley (21 episodes, 1998)
 Crusade as Capt. Elizabeth Lochley (13 episodes, 1999)
 Felicity as Kelly (1 episode, 2001)
 Nip/Tuck as Jill White (1 episode, 2006)
 Dante's Cove as Grace Neville (12 episodes, 2005–2007)
 NCIS as Tabitha Summers (1 episode, 2008)
 Castle as Lana (1 episode, 2012)

Film

 Twirl (1981) as Cindy Ryan
 Toy Soldiers (1984) as Monique
 In Dangerous Company (1988) as Evelyn
 Jury Duty: The Comedy (1990) as Hope Hathaway
 Dan Turner, Hollywood Detective (1990) as Vala Duvalle
 The Gumshoe Kid (1990) as Rita Benson
 Play Murder for Me (1990) as Tricia Merritt
 Face the Edge (1990) as Cindy
 Watchers II (1990) as Barbara White
 Timebomb (1991) as Ms. Blue
 Ultimate Desires (1991) as Samantha Stewart
 Demonic Toys (1992) as Judith Gray
 Alien Intruder (1993) as Ariel
 Dollman vs. Demonic Toys (1993) as Judith Gray
 Dead On (1994) as Marla Beaumont
 Dallas: J.R. Returns (1996) (TV) as Anita Smithfield
 Dallas: War of the Ewings (1998) (TV) as Anita Smithfield
 Babylon 5: The River of Souls (1998) (TV) as Capt. Elizabeth Lochley
 Babylon 5: A Call to Arms (1999) (TV) as Capt. Elizabeth Lochley
 A Crack in the Floor (2001) as Jeremiah's Mother
 Hellborn (2003) as Helen
 Homeland Security (2004) as Catherine Adel
 Popstar (2005) as Judy McQueen
 The Cutter (2005) as Alena
 Saurian (2006) as Simtra
 Mr. Hell (2006) as Dominique Horney
 The Strange Case of Dr. Jekyll and Mr. Hyde (2006) as Detective Karen Utterson
 Babylon 5: The Lost Tales (2007) as Colonel Elizabeth Lochley
 Otis (2008) as Rita Vitale
 Cat Power (2013) as Julie Richman
 Borrowed Moments'' (2014) as Betsy

References

External links

 

20th-century American actresses
21st-century American actresses
Actresses from Texas
American film actresses
American television actresses
Female models from Texas
Living people
People from Galveston, Texas
Texas State University alumni
1953 births